Turbonilla schlumbergeri is a species of sea snail, a marine gastropod mollusk in the family Pyramidellidae, the pyrams and their allies.

Distribution
This marine species is endemic to the Azores, found at a depth of 620 m.

Description
The shell of this marine species grows to a length of 7.6 mm.

References

 Dautzenberg P. & Fischer H. (1896). Dragages effectués par l'Hirondelle et par la Princesse Alice 1888-1895. 1. Mollusques Gastropodes. Mémoires de la Société Zoologique de France 9: 395-498, pl. 15-22

External links
 To Biodiversity Heritage Library (1 publication)
 To CLEMAM
 To Encyclopedia of Life

schlumbergeri
Gastropods described in 1896
Molluscs of the Azores